Alessandro Cortinovis (born October 11, 1977) is a former Italian road racing cyclist who rode professionally between 1999 and 2007.

Career
A year later he would make a switch to Team Colpack. For this team he made his Giro d'Italia debut in 2001, finishing in 90th position overall. For , he improved that effort in 2005 with 98th place and in the Vuelta a España he came 82nd.

He also took part in the 2007 Tour de France. He did not won any professional races in his career.

After the 2007 season, Cortinovis could not find a team, and ended his career.

References

External links

1977 births
Living people
People from Seriate
Italian male cyclists
Cyclists from the Province of Bergamo